The Merrimack Valley Transit, (MEVA), Formerly Merrimack Valley Regional Transit Authority (MVRTA) is a public, non-profit organization in Massachusetts, United States, charged with providing public transportation to an area consisting of the cities and towns of Amesbury, Andover, Boxford, Georgetown, Groveland, Haverhill, Lawrence, Merrimac, Methuen, Newbury, Newburyport, North Andover, Rowley, Salisbury and West Newbury, as well as a seasonal service to the popular nearby summer destination of Hampton Beach, New Hampshire.

The MEVA provides fixed route bus services and paratransit services within its area, together with services to Lowell. MEVA's buses provide interchange with commuter lines of the Massachusetts Bay Transportation Authority (MBTA) at Andover Station, Haverhill station, Lawrence station, Lowell station and Newburyport station.

The MEVA started operation in 1976, having been created under Chapter 161B of the Massachusetts General Laws. Since 1983, operation of the MEVA has been subcontracted to First Transit, a subsidiary of the United Kingdom based FirstGroup.

As of March 1, 2022 all local routes are free.

Routes

Buses generally start service at 5:00, 5:30, or 6:00 am, and the last bus for each route is at 6:00 or 7:00 pm.

01 and 41
01 Lawrence-Methuen-Haverhill
41 Lawrence-Lowell

Buses 01 and 41 are actually two segments of one continuous bus. From west to east, Bus 41 starts at the  Lowell commuter rail station, which is also the terminal for the LRTA, and it goes into Dracut, Methuen, and Lawrence. At the Buckley Transportation Center, the bus switches numbers to become Bus 01, which then goes through a different part of Methuen, provides access to The Loop, and then goes into Haverhill, ending at the Washington Square Transit Station, near the Haverhill commuter rail. Most of this route is on Route 110.

Buses 01 and 41 run every half hour on weekdays and every hour on weekends.

13 through 18

13 Main Street/North Avenue
14 Bradford/Ward Hill
15 Hilldale Avenue/Haverhill Commons
16 Washington Street/Westgate Plaza
18 Riverside

These five buses are used for transport within Haverhill. Each of these buses is a shuttle between the Washington Square Transit Station, which is near the Haverhill commuter rail station, and another part of Haverhill. Bus 13 goes north crossing the New Hampshire border. stopping at Market Basket, TJ Maxx, and Walmart in Plaistow. Bus 14 goes south into Bradford, Buses 15 and 16 take different routes going west, and Bus 18 goes east.

These five buses run every hour on weekdays and Saturdays, leaving the Washington Square Transit Station on the hour.

32 through 40 and 85

32 Andover
33 North Andover
34 Prospect Hill
35 Water Street
36 Lawrence Street
37 Beacon Street
39A Doctor's Park
39B Phillips Street
40 Methuen Square/Village Plaza
85 Lawrence Downtown Shuttle

These ten buses leave the Buckley Transportation Center in Lawrence every hour, going in different directions. Buses 33, 39A, and 39B go to the North Andover Mall in different ways. Buses 32 and 33 provide access to commuter rail stations in Andover and Lawrence, respectively. Bus 35 mostly parallels Bus 41, going west into Methuen and ending just before reaching Interstate 93, while Bus 41 continues further. Bus 37 goes west along Andover St. into the western part of Andover, and Bus 40 goes north to Methuen.

Buses 34 and 85 travel within Lawrence, while Bus 36 is mostly in Lawrence but provides access to the Holy Family Hospital in Methuen. Bus 34 provides access to Lawrence General Hospital. Bus 85 travels in a loop around Downtown Lawrence.

These ten buses run every hour. The buses all leave Buckley Transportation Center at the same time to reduce time spent waiting during transfers.

51 and 54

51 Haverhill-NECC-Merrimac-Amesbury-Newburyport
54 Amesbury-Newburyport-Salisbury Beach

Buses 51 and 54, which are two numbers for one bus similar to 01 and 41, run from Washington Square Transit Station in Haverhill to Northern Essex Community College and the towns of Merrimac, Amesbury, Newburyport, and Salisbury, ending at Salisbury Beach. The section in Newburyport allows passengers to access the Newburyport station on the Commuter Rail. The bus is numbered 51 west of Amesbury and 54 east of Amesbury. Buses 51 and 54 are on a 70-minute cycle weekends and are on 60 minute cycle weekdays .

Other
21 Andover Shuttle
53 Newburyport Summer Shuttle (former)
56 Northern Essex Community College (inactive)
57 Newburyport Shuttle
73 Haverhill - IRS/Raytheon (former)
75 Lawrence - IRS/Raytheon
83 Lawrence-Haverhill-Salisbury Beach-Hampton Beach (summer only)

Bus 21 runs on a 70-minute cycle between Downtown Andover and the North Andover Mall.

Bus 57 runs on a 30 minute cycle between Port Plaza and State Street in Newburyport.

Bus 75 runs twice per day from Lawrence to Raytheon and IRS locations in Andover. It does return trips in the afternoon. Bus 73 used to run once per day from Haverhill to the same Raytheon and IRS locations, but it was discontinued in 2018.

During the summer, bus 83 runs twice per day on Saturdays only as an express from Lawrence to Salisbury Beach and Hampton Beach, and does the return trip several hours later.

Fleet roster

References

External links
MVRTA official website

Bus transportation in Massachusetts
Lawrence, Massachusetts
Transportation in Essex County, Massachusetts